In 1993 the world governing body for Sambo(FIAS) split into two organizations, both of which used the same name and logo. The two groups were often referred to as FIAS “East”, under Russian control, and FIAS “West”, under United States and Western European control. This division for control of Sambo created two world championships. The 1994 World Sambo Championships East were held in Novi Sad, Yugoslavia and the 1994 World Sambo Championships West were held in Montreal, Canada.

Medal overview

External links 
Results on Sambo.net.ua

World Sambo Championships
Sports competitions in Novi Sad
20th century in Novi Sad
1994 in Yugoslav sport